Rahul Khanna (born 20 June 1972) is an Indian actor, VJ and writer who works in Bollywood. He is the older son of actor Vinod Khanna and the older brother of Akshaye Khanna.

Early life and background 
Khanna was born and raised in Mumbai. His father was a Bollywood star & a politician, Vinod Khanna, his mother was ex-model Gitanjali Taleyar Khanna, and his younger brother is Bollywood actor, Akshaye Khanna.

Khanna studied at the Lee Strasberg Theatre Institute and the School of Visual Arts in New York City.

Film 
He made his feature film debut in Deepa Mehta's 1947 Earth (1999), alongside Aamir Khan. His performance earned him several awards including the Filmfare Best Male Debut Award. He has since appeared in Mehta's Bollywood/Hollywood (2003) and Wake up Sid starring Ranbir Kapoor and Konkana Sen Sharma.

Rahul's mainstream Bollywood films include Elaan and Raqeeb and his international credits include The Emperor's Club with Kevin Kline.

Television 
MTV Asia, VJ, 1994–1998

Asian Variety Show, Host, AVS TV Network, North America, 1999–2001

Discovery Week, Host, Discovery Channel, 2006

Khanna has also hosted numerous events like the IIFA Awards, the Miss India pageant, the Screen Awards, the Stardust (magazine) Awards, the Miss India Worldwide pageant, Naomi Campbell's Fashion for Relief show at Mumbai Fashion Week, the GQ (India) Men of the Year Awards 2009 & 2010, Teacher's Achievement Awards 2008 & 2010, The International Film Festival of India 2011, The Hello (magazine) Hall of Fame Awards 2011 and The Ernst & Young Entrepreneur of the Year Awards 2012, to name just a few.

Commercials and endorsements 
Khanna has been associated with several brands including Toyota, Lay's Chips, Pepsi, DTC (Diamond Trading Company/ De Beers group), Trent (Westside), Tommy Hilfiger, Jaypee Group's Jaypee Greens, Johnnie Walker Blue Label, Kiehl's, Maggi and Audi.

Khanna has appeared in a PETA India campaign to protect elephants and birds.

Writing 
Khanna has a signature humorous writing style. Apart from writing for his own blog, his pieces and essays have been published in several leading newspapers, magazines and websites including Harper's Bazaar India, Vogue India, Cosmopolitan (magazine) India, Elle (India), GQ India, Marie Claire India, The Times of India, Deccan Herald and The Huffington Post India.

Filmography

Television

References

External links 
 Rahul Khanna - Official Site

Rahul Khanna's Twitter page
Rahul Khanna Videos

Khanna Rahul
Indian male voice actors
1972 births
Male actors from Mumbai
Living people
Lee Strasberg Theatre and Film Institute alumni
School of Visual Arts alumni
Indian VJs (media personalities)
Male actors in Hindi cinema
Filmfare Awards winners